Didymosphaeria is a genus of fungi in the family Didymosphaeriaceae.

References

Further reading

External links
 Index Fungorum

Pleosporales
Dothideomycetes genera
Taxa named by Karl Wilhelm Gottlieb Leopold Fuckel
Taxa described in 1870